Jean Piero Pérez (born 7 March 1981) is a Venezuelan professional boxer and is the current interim World Boxing Association flyweight champion.

Professional career
Pérez made his professional debut on April 24, 2004 defeating Panama's Eloy Carpintero in the Gimnasio Rafael Hernández in Panama City.

On January 29, 2011, Pérez won a twelve round unanimous decision over Jesús Jiménez of Mexico to capture the interim WBA flyweight title. The bout was held at the Arena Cliseo, Guadalajara, Mexico.

He who won the gold medal as an amateur at the 2002 Central American and Caribbean Games in San Salvador. In the final he defeated Puerto Rico's Carlos Valcárcel.

References

External links

|-

Flyweight boxers
1981 births
Living people
Venezuelan male boxers
Boxers at the 2003 Pan American Games
Central American and Caribbean Games gold medalists for Venezuela
Competitors at the 2002 Central American and Caribbean Games
South American Games bronze medalists for Venezuela
South American Games medalists in boxing
Competitors at the 2002 South American Games
Central American and Caribbean Games medalists in boxing
Pan American Games competitors for Venezuela
21st-century Venezuelan people